Guillermo Squella (18 March 1923 – 11 December 2010) was a Chilean equestrian. He competed in two events at the 1968 Summer Olympics.

References

1923 births
2010 deaths
Chilean male equestrians
Chilean dressage riders
Olympic equestrians of Chile
Equestrians at the 1968 Summer Olympics
Pan American Games medalists in equestrian
Pan American Games gold medalists for Chile
Pan American Games silver medalists for Chile
Pan American Games bronze medalists for Chile
Equestrians at the 1951 Pan American Games
Equestrians at the 1967 Pan American Games
Sportspeople from Santiago
Medalists at the 1951 Pan American Games
Medalists at the 1967 Pan American Games
20th-century Chilean people